Stephen Vincent McGann (born 2 February 1963) is a British actor, best known for portraying Dr Patrick Turner in the BBC One medical period drama series Call the Midwife. He is one of a family of acting brothers, the others being Joe, Paul, and Mark.

McGann was born in Kensington, Liverpool, and began his professional acting career in 1982, starring in the West End musical Yakety Yak. He has since worked extensively in British theatre and on screen.

Early life
Stephen's father Joe was a Royal Naval Commando who died in 1984, and his mother Clare was a teacher. Along with his acting brothers Paul, Mark, and Joe who's named after his father, he also has a younger sister named Clare after their mother.

Career

Acting
In 1989, he starred as Mickey in the West End hit musical Blood Brothers. In 1990, he played Johann Strauss in the international mini-series, The Strauss Dynasty. In 1993, he created, co-produced and starred in the award-winning BBC drama The Hanging Gale. He portrayed the character of Sean Reynolds in Emmerdale from 1999 to 2002.

In 2003, he starred with Jamie Theakston in the hit West End play 'Art'. In 2006, he played the role of the Reverend Shaw in the original West End cast of the musical Footloose. He can currently be seen playing Dr. Turner in BBC TV series Call the Midwife.

Science communicator

In addition to his acting, McGann is a public speaker and communicator of science. He graduated from Imperial College London with a master's degree in Science Communication.

He was a guest speaker at the Cambridge Science Festival in March 2015.  He published a guest essay in the Journal of the Royal Society of Medicine in April 2015, discussing issues of medical accuracy and communication in Call the Midwife.

In January 2016, McGann published a companion book to Call the Midwife called Doctor Turner's Casebook, in which he revisits key medical cases featured in the TV series and discusses their historical and social contexts. The BBC screened a documentary special based on the book, titled Call The Midwife: The Casebook, on 15 January 2017.

In July 2017, McGann published Flesh and Blood: A History of My Family in Seven Maladies, a personal history of his family over a century and a half as told through the medical ailments they suffered.

McGann was a member of the judging panel for the 2019 Royal Society Insight Investment Science Book Prize., and holds an honorary doctorate from the University of Liverpool and the University of Chester in recognition of his contribution to public health communication and drama

Personal life
Stephen McGann is married to screenwriter and Call the Midwife creator Heidi Thomas. They have one son, Dominic. They currently live in Cambridge.

Filmography

References

External links
 

1963 births
Living people
English male film actors
English male television actors
English male musical theatre actors
Male actors from Liverpool
People from Saffron Walden
English people of Irish descent
Stephen
20th-century English male actors
21st-century English male actors
Alumni of Imperial College London